Sir William Robert McKay, KCB, (born 18 April 1939), is a British administrator.  He was Clerk of the House of Commons between 1998 and 2002, and was appointed in 2012 to chair the Commission on the consequences of devolution for the House of Commons, which reported the following year.

Biography
After graduating from the University of Edinburgh, he entered the Clerks Department of the House of Commons in 1961, rising to become Clerk of the House in 1998.  Following his retirement in 2002, he took up a position as professor in the School of Law at Aberdeen University, and served on various bodies dealing with legal and constitutional matters, including the Legal Questions Committee of the General Assembly of the Church of Scotland, and as an observer on the Law Society of Scotland’s ruling council. In 2012 he was appointed to chair the Commission on the consequences of devolution for the House of Commons, which reported on 25 March 2013.

He is married to a Church of Scotland Minister and has two daughters and four grandchildren.

References

1939 births
Living people
Clerks of the House of Commons
Knights Commander of the Order of the Bath